Abune Yacob (5 July 1924 – 1 December 2003) was the second patriarch of the Eritrean Orthodox Tewahedo Church.

Born, raised and ordained in Eritrea, initially he had been made an archbishop of the Ethiopian Orthodox Church, and had even served briefly as locum tenens (acting patriarch) of the Ethiopian Orthodox Tewahedo Church following the abdication of Patriarch Merkorios in 1991. However, following the split of the Eritrean Orthodox Church from the Ethiopian Church, he moved to the Eritrean synod as a native Eritrean. He succeeded Phillipos, the first patriarch of the church, after the autocephaly of the Eritrean Orthodox Tewahedo Church was recognised in 1994. He reigned only briefly before his death on 1 December 2003. He was succeeded by Antonios.

1924 births
2003 deaths
Patriarchs of Eritrea
Eritrean Oriental Orthodox Christians
21st-century Oriental Orthodox archbishops